Resminostat (4SC-201 or RAS2410) is an orally bioavailable inhibitor of histone deacetylases (HDACs), of which inhibitors are antineoplastic agents.

In 2011, the German drug maker 4SC was granted orphan drug designation for resminostat by the US FDA for the treatment of hepatocellular carcinoma (HCC).

In 2016 the FDA granted [another?] IND for clinical tests in combination with sorafenib for HCC. 4SC say "In several phase I and phase II trials, resminostat has already demonstrated very good safety and tolerability, alongside promising indications of efficacy."

Clinical trials
It has undergone a phase I/II clinical trial for K-ras mutated advanced colorectal carcinoma.

It has undergone a phase II clinical trial for relapsed or refractory Hodgkin's Lymphoma.

Mechanism 
Resminostat restrains the phosphorylation of 4E-BP1 and p70S6k, indicating a disturbance with Akt signalling pathway. The treatment of resminostat leads to a drop of Bim and Bax protein level and Bcl-xL level.

As with other HDAC inhibitors such as pracinostat, the inhibition of HDACs by resminostat results in an accumulation of highly acetylated histones, followed by an abduction of chromatin remodeling, inhibition of tumor suppressor genes transcription and cell division, and finally tumor cell apoptosis.

References

Histone deacetylase inhibitors
Sulfonamides
Hydroxamic acids
Experimental drugs
Pyrroles